Osman Orsal is a photo-journalist for the international news agency. Reuters.   Orsal resides in Istanbul, Turkey.

On 28 May 2013, Orsal covered the 2013 protests in Turkey, capturing an iconic set of images of the protests. The images shows a young protester (later nicknamed the "woman in red"), a young woman in a red dress, as she stands her ground while she is sprayed by a policeman. The Washington Post  reported that the image "encapsulates Turkey’s protests and the severe police crackdown". Protesters later re-used the image in posters, accompanied by the slogan "The more you spray the bigger we get".

On 29 May, Orsal was injured by police when he was struck in the head by a gas canister. A photograph of Orsal, with blood streaming down his face, was widely distributed.

References

Living people
Turkish photojournalists
Year of birth missing (living people)